The 2017 Tashkent Challenger was a professional tennis tournament played on hard courts. It was the tenth edition of the tournament which was part of the 2017 ATP Challenger Tour. It took place in Tashkent, Uzbekistan between 9 and 14 October 2017.

Singles main-draw entrants

Seeds

 1 Rankings are as of 2 October 2017.

Other entrants
The following players received wildcards into the singles main draw:
  Farrukh Dustov
  Temur Ismailov
  Jurabek Karimov
  Khumoyun Sultanov

The following players received entry from the qualifying draw:
  Luca Margaroli
  Denys Molchanov
  Danilo Petrović
  Denis Yevseyev

The following players received entry as lucky losers:
  Ivan Gakhov
  Ivan Nedelko

Champions

Singles

  Guillermo García López def.  Kamil Majchrzak 6–1, 7–6(7–1).

Doubles

  Hans Podlipnik Castillo /  Andrei Vasilevski def.  Yuki Bhambri /  Divij Sharan 6–4, 6–2.

References

External links
Official Website

2017 ATP Challenger Tour
2017
October 2017 sports events in Asia